Federal Route 198, or Jalan Jedok-Air Canal-Legeh, is a federal road in Kelantan, Malaysia. The route connects Jedok in the northeast and Kampung Legeh in the southwest.

History  
In 2003, the highway was gazetted as Federal Route 198.

Features

At most sections, the Federal Route 198 was built under the JKR R5 road standard, allowing maximum speed limit of up to 90 km/h.

Major intersections 
The entire route is in Kelantan, Malaysia.

See also 
 List of highways numbered 198

References

External links 
 Malaysia Federal Route Map, Ministry of Works Malaysia

Malaysian Federal Roads
Roads in Kelantan